Baltic Cup may refer to:

Baltic Cup (figure skating)
Baltic Cup (football)
U21 Baltic Cup
U19 Baltic Cup
U17 Baltic Cup
Women's Baltic Cup
Women's U-19 Baltic Cup
Women's U-17 Baltic Cup
Women's U-15 Baltic Cup
Baltic Futsal Cup
Baltic Cup (ice hockey)
Baltic Cup (chess)
Baltic Cup (cricket)
Baltic Cup (draughts)
Baltic Cup (racing)
Baltic Champions Cup

See also
Baltic League (disambiguation)